The Canton of Pontarion is a former canton situated in the Creuse département and in the Limousin region of central France. It was disbanded following the French canton reorganisation which came into effect in March 2015. It had 2,809 inhabitants (2012).

Geography 
A farming area in the arrondissement of Guéret, centred on the village of Pontarion. The altitude varies from 390m (Thauron) to 760m (Vidaillat) with an average altitude of 534m.

The canton comprised 10 communes:

La Chapelle-Saint-Martial
Janaillat
Pontarion
La Pouge
Saint-Éloi
Saint-Georges-la-Pouge
Saint-Hilaire-le-Château
Sardent
Thauron
Vidaillat

Population

See also 
 Arrondissements of the Creuse department
 Cantons of the Creuse department
 Communes of the Creuse department

References

Pontarion
2015 disestablishments in France
States and territories disestablished in 2015